"Hold My Girl" is a song by English singer-songwriter George Ezra. The song was written by Ezra and Joel Pott, and produced by Cam Blackwood. It was initially released as the second promotional single from Ezra's second studio album Staying at Tamara's on 9 March 2018 but later selected to be the album's fourth single and released to radio on 28 September 2018. The song spent 26 weeks on the UK Singles Chart. The song was added to Australian radio in January 2019.

Critical reception
In a review for NME, Nick Reilly said, "The emotional thread gets a lot more serious during the final third, notably on the soft cut 'Hold My Girl', which sees Ezra ditching the twanging guitars for his most soul-baring song yet – one destined to become first-dance material."

Music video
A lyric video to accompany the release of "Hold My Girl" was first released onto YouTube on 9 March 2018 at a total length of three minutes and thirty-five seconds and has about 8 million views as of February 2019. This was followed by a stripped back performance of the track at Abbey Road Studios being uploaded a week later on 16 March 2018. The official music video for the single was released in Autumn 2018 and has over 2 million views as of December 2018.

Track listing

Charts

Weekly charts

Year-end charts

Certifications

Release history

References

2018 singles
2018 songs
George Ezra songs
Songs written by George Ezra
Songs written by Joel Pott
Song recordings produced by Cam Blackwood